James Fitch may refer to:

 James P. Fitch (1887–1964), notable in the early history of the Boy Scouts of America 
 James Fitch (minister) (1622–1702), instrumental in the founding of Norwich and Lebanon, Connecticut
 James Marston Fitch (1909–2000), architect and preservationist